Fred Richard Zeller (September 5, 1899 – March 7, 1978) was an American politician, businessman, and white-collar criminal who served as Connecticut State Comptroller for 14 years between 1939 and 1959.

Political career 
Zeller served 14 years as Connecticut State Comptroller between 1939 and 1959. A Republican, he ran for governor in 1958 but lost to Democratic incumbent Abraham Ribicoff, who garnered 62% of the vote to Zeller's 37%. After serving on the Stonington Board of Education, Zeller had served as a member of the Connecticut State Senate from 1936 to 1938.

Conviction 
In 1966, Zeller pled guilty to having embezzled $26,297 from the First Baptist Church of Stonington, Connecticut, where he had served as church treasurer for many years. He was sentenced to 1–3 years in prison and served nine months.

Personal life 
The son of a German immigrant, Zeller was born in Stonington, where he lived his entire life other than short sojourns in West Hartford and Seekonk, Massachusetts, while in his 70s. He attended Stonington's public schools and worked as secretary and treasurer for a Bridgeport-based manufacturer and as president of a New York-based manufacturer. Zeller died at Providence Hospital in Rhode Island at the age of 78. He was survived by his wife, Marjorie Mackenzie Zeller, and two daughters.

References 

1899 births
1978 deaths
People from Stonington, Connecticut
American people of German descent
20th-century American politicians
Connecticut Comptrollers
Republican Party Connecticut state senators
Businesspeople from Connecticut
American people convicted of fraud
Connecticut politicians convicted of crimes